Leica Society International (formerly LHSA - The International Leica Society, and formerly Leica Historical Society of America) is an independent, nonprofit membership organization dedicated to everything regarding the Leica camera. It changed its name in 2023 to Leica Society International. Before then, It changed its name in 2012 to "LHSA - The International Leica Society" so as to be international rather than American.

The LHSA is mainly for collectors of Leica historical and rare pieces of Leica cameras and lenses. LHSA has also originated limited LHSA-editions of Leica cameras and lenses that Leica Camera AG has created, for example the Leica MP 3 0.72 LHSA Special Edition.

Publications 
Viewfinder, a quarterly journal, dedicated to Leica use and history.

References

External links 
 

Non-profit organizations based in the United States
American photography organizations
Organizations with year of establishment missing